The 1989 Toledo Rockets football team was an American football team that represented the University of Toledo in the Mid-American Conference (MAC) during the 1988 NCAA Division I-A football season. In their eighth season under head coach Dan Simrell, the Rockets compiled a 6–5 record (6–2 against MAC opponents), finished in a tie for second place in the MAC, and were outscored by all opponents by a combined total of 272 to 254.

The team's statistical leaders included Mark Melfi with 1,632 passing yards, Wayne Goodwin with 859 rushing yards, and Rick Isaiah with 743 receiving yards.

Schedule

References

Toledo
Toledo Rockets football seasons
Toledo Rockets football